Urgubamakhi (Dargwa: Ургубамахьи) is a rural locality (a selo) in Akushinsky Selsoviet, Akushinsky District, Republic of Dagestan, Russia. The population was 1,069 as of 2010. There are 19 streets.

Geography 
Urgubamakhi is located 3 km northwest of Akusha (the district's administrative centre) by road. Tserkhimakhi is the nearest rural locality.

References 

Rural localities in Akushinsky District